Özdemiroğlu Osman Pasha (1526 – 29 October 1585) was an Ottoman statesman and military commander who also held the office of grand vizier for one year.

Origin 
After the Ottoman conquest of Egypt in 1517, the former Egyptian soldier had accepted the Ottoman dominance and became part of Ottoman bureaucracy and military. After the Ottoman naval expeditions in the Indian Ocean, he was appointed as the beylerbey (high governor) of Habesh Eyalet (modern Ethiopia, but actually only the coastal strip of Eritrea and Sudan).

Osman was born in 1526 in Cairo, a part of Egypt Eyalet (province) of the Ottoman Empire.

Early years 
Osman was appointed to various posts in Egypt by the porte. After his father's death in 1561, Osman continued as the governor of Habesh Eyalet for 7 years. In 1569, he was appointed as the governor of Yemen and in 1573, as the governor of Diyarbekir Eyalet (modern Diyarbakır, Turkey).

Battles 
While in Diyarbekir, he was assigned to join the army during the Ottoman–Safavid War (1578–1590). His troops fought well and contributed much to the victory during the Battle of Çıldır. After the battle, he was assigned to organize the newly conquered territories in the Caucasus. While establishing an effective Ottoman administration, he also had to fight against Persians who were trying to regain their losses. In 1583, he fought against a Persian army in Baştepe a location in North Caucasus (modern Dagestan Republic of Russia) in a three-day clash named Battle of Torches, (named so because the battle continued into the night). He defeated the Persian army and secured Ottoman presence in the Caucasus.

His next mission was dethroning the Crimean khan Mehmed II Giray, who was an unreliable vassal, and enthroning a new khan, in which he was also successful. Then, from Crimea he sailed to Istanbul, the capital, where he was praised by the sultan Murat III.

Last years 
On 28 May 1584, he was promoted to be the grand vizier, also keeping the title of high commander of the army. Next year, he was again at the battle front. He conquered Tebriz, West Iran. However, a few weeks later on 29 October 1585, he fell ill and died. He was buried in Diyarbekir.

See also 
 List of Ottoman Grand Viziers

References 

16th-century Grand Viziers of the Ottoman Empire
Pashas
People from the Ottoman Empire of Circassian descent
1526 births
1585 deaths
Ottoman governors of Yemen
Ottoman people of the Ottoman–Persian Wars